Michael Douglas (born 1940, died on 30 April 1992) was a politician from Dominica. He served as Member of Parliament for the Portsmouth constituency since 1975 and as well as a cabinet minister for a number of years, including as Minister of Finance from 1979 to 1980. Later he became the political leader of the Dominica Labour Party, and Leader of the Opposition from 1985 to 1990. He resigned from party leadership position in early 1992 due to an inoperable cancer. He was temporarily succeeded as party leader by the deputy leader Pierre Charles, until November 1992, when his brother Roosevelt Douglas was elected as the party chairman.

He was brother to the Prime Minister of Dominica Roosevelt Douglas and father of current Cabinet Minister Ian Douglas.

Legacy
 Michael Douglas Boulevard in Portsmouth is named after him.

References

External links
 Sean Douglas, "Commentary: Remembering Mike Douglas", Dominica News Online, 30 April 2012.

1992 deaths
Dominica Labour Party politicians
Government ministers of Dominica
Finance ministers of Dominica
Members of the House of Assembly of Dominica
People from Saint John Parish, Dominica
1940 births